Bangin (also Romanized as Bangīn; also known as Bangī, Bankīn, Banmakīn, and Pan’gi) is a village in Dowlatabad Rural District, in the Central District of Marand County, East Azerbaijan Province, Iran. At the 2006 census, its population was 992, in 265 families.

References 

Populated places in Marand County